Kerrville Municipal Airport  (Louis Schreiner Field) is six miles southeast of Kerrville, in Kerr County, Texas. The National Plan of Integrated Airport Systems for 2011–2015 categorized it as a general aviation facility.

History 
The airport opened in February 1943 as Louis Schreiner Field  and was used by the United States Army Air Forces as a training base. At the end of the war the airfield was determined to be excess by the military and turned over to the local government for civil use.

Trans-Texas DC-3s stopped there until 1959–60.

Facilities
Kerrville Municipal Airport covers 528 acres (214 ha) at an elevation of 1,617 feet (493 m). It has two asphalt runways: 12/30 is 6,000 by 100 feet (1,829 x 30 m) and 3/21 is 3,592 by 60 feet (1,095 x 18 m).

In the year ending August 5, 2011 the airport had 59,800 general aviation operations, average 163 per day. 149 aircraft were then based at the airport: 86% single-engine, 5% multi-engine, 3% jet, 5% helicopter, and 1% glider.

See also 

 Texas World War II Army Airfields
 List of airports in Texas

References

External links 
 Kerrville/Kerr County Airport at Louis Schreiner Field
 Kerrville Aviation, the fixed-base operator (FBO)
 Kerrville Muni / Louis Schreiner Field (ERV) at Texas DOT Airport Directory
 Aerial image as of February 1995 from USGS The National Map
 

Airports in Texas
Buildings and structures in Kerr County, Texas
Transportation in Kerr County, Texas
Airfields of the United States Army Air Forces in Texas